Tanton is a surname. It may refer to the following people:

 James Tanton (born 1966), mathematician 
 Janice Tanton (born 1961), Canadian artist
 John Tanton (1934–2019), United States immigration reduction activist
 Lindy Elkins-Tanton, American planetary scientist
 Miguel Tanton (born 1989), Filipino-American football player